Antonio Muratore (22 May 1927 – 11 January 2023) was an Italian veterinarian and politician. A member of the Italian Socialist Party, he served in the Senate of the Republic from 1983 to 1994.

Muratore died in Guidonia Montecelio on 11 January 2023, at the age of 95.

References

1927 births
2023 deaths
Italian veterinarians
Italian Socialist Party politicians
Senators of Legislature IX of Italy
Senators of Legislature X of Italy
Senators of Legislature XII of Italy
People from Canicattì